Noemi Lois is a Clinical Professor of Ophthalmology at Queen's University Belfast and an Honorary Consultant Ophthalmologist and Vitreoretinal Surgeon at the Belfast Health and Social Care Trust.

Early career 
Professor Lois received her Doctor of Medicine at University Santiago de Compostela in 1990 and Doctor of Philosophy in 1997. Noemi did her Residency in Ophthalmology in Spain and then completed clinical fellowships in 1) Ocular Oncology at Wills Eye Hospital, Philadelphia, with Drs Jerry and Carol Shields, 2) Medical Retina at Moorfields Eye Hospital, London, with Prof Alan Bird, and 3) Vitreoretinal Surgery at The Royal Liverpool University Hospital with Prof David Wong.  Noemi then moved to Aberdeen, Scotland, where she worked as full time Consultant Ophthalmic Surgeon for 13 years.

Current Position 
Noemi moved to Queens in 2013 where she has been leading a programme of preclinical and clinical research focused on diabetic retinopathy and its complications (diabetic macular oedema and proliferative diabetic retinopathy).  This programme of research extends from pathogenic mechanisms of disease and risk stratification to new therapies, including determining the most cost-effective therapeutic alternatives for this disease.

Clinical Activities 
Noemi is an Honorary Consultant Ophthalmic Vitreoretinal surgeon, clinically active.  Noemi undertakes medical and surgical retina clinics, vitreoretinal and cataract surgery at the Belfast Health and Social Care Trust.

Academic Activities 
Noemi’s academic work is focused in identifying and evaluating novel technologies to improve eye care.   Her academic portfolio includes a range of translational activities investigating mechanisms of disease and novel therapeutic targets, and also assessments of effectiveness and cost-effectiveness of technologies and models of care for eye diseases.  

Noemi is an ad-hoc referee for numerous peer-review journals and funding bodies and has given numerous lectures as guest speaker at national and international meetings in China, India, Indonesia, Ireland, Italy, Malaysia, Singapore, South Africa, Switzerland, USA and the UK.  Noemi is editorial board member for several journals including the Cochrane Eyes and Vision Group.

Noemi has participated, as a member of the Evidence Review Group, in 10 Single Technology Appraisals for the UK National Institute of Health and Care Excellence (NICE) on new therapies for eye diseases.

Noemi has received numerous grants to support her programme of research. 

 the National Institute for Health Research (NIHR), DIAMONDS - Diabetic Macular Oedema aNd Diode Subthreshold micropulse laser. http://www.nictu.hscni.net/diamonds-trial-team/ (£1.08M) and EMERALD - Effectiveness of Multimodal imaging for the Evaluation of Retinal oedema And New vesseLs in    Diabetic retinopathy http://www.nictu.hscni.net/emerald-trial/  (£816K)
 Medical Research Council (MRC), STREAMLINE – Stratifying treatment for diabetic macular oedema using induced pluripotent stem cell technology (£78K)
 the European Union (EU, Horizon 2020) RECOGNISED - Retinal and cognitive dysfunction in type 2 diabetes: unraveling the common pathways and identification of patients at risk of dementia  https://www.recognised.eu/ (~€6M)

 the Centre for Public Health, Performance of EArly Retinal Laser (PEARL) (£146K) among others.

Professor Lois leads a programme of clinical and preclinical research into diabetic retinopathy at the Wellcome-Wolfson Institute for Experimental Medicine, Queen's University Belfast and has published over 100 articles in peer reviewed journals. She is the editor of three textbooks, one of which on its second edition and has authored over 13 book chapters. Noemi has supervised numerous PhD, MSc and BSc students as well as clinical fellows.

Noemi is a reviewer for grant funding bodies including the Health Technology Assessment (HTA) programme and for the Efficacy of Mechanisms (EME) programmes of the National Institute for Health Research (NIHR) and Wellcome Trust

References 

Year of birth missing (living people)
Living people
Spanish ophthalmologists
University of Santiago de Compostela alumni
Women ophthalmologists